Arne Rostad (4 March 1894 – 21 June 1969) was a Norwegian politician for the Farmers' Party.

He was elected to the Norwegian Parliament from Oppland in 1945, but he was not re-elected in 1949.

Born in Verdal, Rostad was a member of Vardal municipal council from 1925 to 1940.

Outside politics he worked as a farmer. He was declared Knight of the Order of St. Olav in 1964.

References

1894 births
1969 deaths
Members of the Storting
Centre Party (Norway) politicians
Politicians from Gjøvik
20th-century Norwegian politicians
People from Verdal